The 1934–35 Bradford City A.F.C. season was the 28th in the club's history.

The club finished 20th in Division Two, and reached the 4th round of the FA Cup.

Sources

References

Bradford City A.F.C. seasons
Bradford City